Chandivali is an upmarket residential neighbourhood located in Andheri East. It is located at a distance of 6 Km from Andheri Railway station on the Western line and around 4 Km from Ghatkopar Railway Station on the Central line. Jogeshwari-Vikhroli Link Road (JVLR) is located at a distance of less than 1 km. It is bound on the north by the Powai lake, on the East by Powai/Hiranandani complex, on the south by Saki Naka and by Marol on the West.There is film studio, one of the oldest in Mumbai with the same name on Chandivali Farm Road and is still active. The locality has a large gated community, Raheja Vihar right at the heart of the area.
 
It has an Assembly constituency in its name and is one of the 288 Assembly constituency in the State of Maharashtra. Chandivali Assembly constituency is part of the Mumbai North Central Lok Sabha constituency along with five other Vidhan Sabha segments, namely Kalina, Vile Parle, Kurla, Vandre West and Vandre East in the Mumbai Suburban district.

See also
Chandivali (Vidhan Sabha constituency)

References

External links
 https://www.mapsofindia.com/mumbai/localities/chandivali.html

Neighbourhoods in Mumbai